Aliabad-e Owkoshi (also Romanized as ‘Alīābād-e Owkoshī; also known as ‘Alīābād) is a village in Beyram Rural District, Beyram District, Larestan County, Fars Province, Iran. At the 2006 census, its population was 104, in 24 families.

References 

Populated places in Larestan County